In the mathematical field of category theory, an amnestic functor F : A → B is a functor for which an  A-isomorphism ƒ is an identity whenever Fƒ is an identity.

An example of a functor which is not amnestic is the forgetful functor Metc→Top from the category of metric spaces with continuous functions for morphisms to the category of topological spaces.

References 

 "Abstract and Concrete Categories. The Joy of Cats".  Jiri Adámek, Horst Herrlich, George E. Strecker.

Functors